Tel Mond is a town in the Sharon region of Israel, located east of Netanya and north of Kfar Saba. In  it had a population of ..

History
Before the 20th century, the area of Tel Mond formed part of the Forest of Sharon, a hallmark of the region’s historical landscape. It was an open woodland dominated by Mount Tabor Oak (Quercus ithaburensis), which extended from Kfar Yona in the north to Ra’ananna in the south. The local Arab inhabitants traditionally used the area for pasture, firewood and intermittent cultivation. The intensification of settlement and agriculture in the coastal plain during the 19th century led to deforestation and subsequent environmental degradation known from Hebrew sources.

Tel Mond was founded on 16 June 1929 by Alfred Mond, 1st Baron Melchett. Lord Melchett was a British industrialist, a former cabinet minister and president of the British Zionist Foundation. The Palestine Plantations Company, headed by Mond, purchased land in the region and planted citrus orchards to provide employment for Jewish laborers. In 1933, a group of farmers purchased land from the company and established moshav Tel Mond.  In 1936, another group established moshav Kfar Ziv, named after Baron Sieff who followed Lord Melchett and settled in Tel Mond with his wife. In 1943, new immigrants from Yemen established Shechunat Ya'akov. The surrounding moshavim, Kfar Hess, Herut and Ein Vered, were also founded by the pioneers of Tel Mond.

Between 11 December 1949 and 10 June 1954, Tel Mond was a regional council, encompassing the villages of Herut, Kfar Hess, Ein Vered, Kfar Yavetz, Kfar Ziv, Shechunat Ya'akov, Bnei Dror, Mishmeret, as well as Tel Mond proper. In the 1950s, Neve Oved and Hadar Hayim were built to accommodate the large wave of immigration (mainly from Yemen) after the founding of the state. In 1954, these communities were merged to form the Local Council of Tel Mond.

Over the 2010s, the community has grown from a small town to a self-sufficient mini-city that provides services for other regional communities. It is growing rapidly, and is expected to have a population exceeding 25,000 in 2030.

In June 2013, Kehillat Mevaser Zion, a Modern Orthodox Community in Tel Mond, held an inauguration ceremony for the newly built Synagogue, attended by Naftali Bennett, the Minister for the Economy.

Landmarks

The home of Lord Melchett has been turned into a museum, named House of the Lord. The museum documents the history of Tel Mond. The museum has a statue of Lord Melchett, designed by Batya Lishansky, located outside the house.

Notable residents
Bart Berman, pianist and composer
Avraham Hirschson, former Finance Minister
Imanuel Rosen, journalist and television personality
Yehoshua Sobol, playwright and theater director
Maya Tahan (born 1999), tennis player

Twin towns
 Sarasota, Florida (1994)

References

 
Local councils in Central District (Israel)
Populated places established in 1929
1929 establishments in Mandatory Palestine